The Beilby Medal and Prize is awarded annually to a scientist or engineer for work that has exceptional practical significance in chemical engineering, applied materials science, energy efficiency or a related field. The prize is jointly administered by the Institute of Materials, Minerals and Mining, the Royal Society of Chemistry and the Society of Chemical Industry, who make the award in rotation.

The award is open to members of the Institute of Materials, Minerals and Mining, the Royal Society of Chemistry and the Society of Chemical Industry as well as other scientists and engineers worldwide. The aim of the award is to recognise the achievements of early-career scientists, and nominees should be no older than 39 years of age.

The Beilby Medal and Prize is awarded in memory of Scottish scientist Sir George Thomas Beilby FRS. Born in 1850, he joined the Oakbank Oil Company in 1869 following his studies at the University of Edinburgh. He later became President of all three organisations or their precursor societies, acting as President of the Society of Chemical Industry from 1898–99, The Institute of Chemistry from 1902–12 and the Institute of Metals from 1916-18.

Recipients of the award receive a medal, a certificate and a prize of £1,000. The first award was made in 1930.

Recipients 
The Beilby Medal and Prize recipients since 1930 are:

 2018 – 
 2017 –  
 2016 –  
 2015 – 
 2014 – Javier Pérez-Ramírez
 2013 – 
 2012 – 
 2011 – 
 2010 – 
 2009 – Zhenan Bao
 2008 – Neil McKeown
 2007 – 
 2006 – 
 2005 – Simon R. Biggs, Nilay Shah
 2004 – 
 2003 – Peter Bruce
 2002 – No award
 2001 – Alfred Cerezo
 2000 – Zheng Xiao Guo
 1999 – John T. S. Irvine, Anthony J. Ryan
 1998 – Costos C. Pantelides
 1997 – Richard A. Williams
 1996 – Paul J. Luckham
 1995 – Lynn F. Gladden
 1994 – 
 1993 – Howard A. Chase, 
 1992 – R. C. Brown
 1991 – Geoffrey J. Ashwell
 1990 – R. F. Dalton
 1989 – No award
 1988 – No award
 1987 – G. E. Thompson
 1986 – Malcolm Robert Mackley
 1985 – George D. W. Smith
 1984 – A. Grint
 1983 – 
 1981 – Derek John Fray, R. M. Nedderman
 1980 – James Barrie Scuffham
 1979 – Stephen F. Bush
 1978 – John Christopher Scully
 1977 – James E. Castle
 1976 – Ian Fells
 1975 – Peter Roland Swann
 1973 – Julian Szekely, G. C. Wood
 1972 – Frank Pearson Lees
 1971 – John Howard Purnell
 1970 – Albert R. C. Westwood
 1969 – Raymond Edward Smallman
 1968 – J. Mardon
 1967 – Anthony Kelly
 1966 – J. F. Davidson
 1965 – J. A. Charles
 1964 – Peter L. Pratt
 1963 – Robert Honeycombe, R. W. B. Nurse
 1961 – C. Edeleanu, John Nutting
 1957 – B. E. Hopkins, Edmund C. Potter
 1956 – R. W. Kear
 1955 – F. D. Richardson, F. Wormwell
 1954 – H. K. Hardy, Sir James Woodham Menter
 1952 – T. V. Arden
 1951 – Kenneth Henderson Jack, W. A. Wood
 1950 – W. A. Baker, G. Whittingham
 1949 – Frank R. N. Nabarro, C. E. Ransley, 
 1948 – A. Stuart C. Lawrence
 1947 – Geoffrey Vincent Raynor, G. R. Rigby
 1940 – F. M. Lea
 1938 – Frank Philip Bowden, B. Jones
 1937 – Bernard Scott Evans, William Harold Juggins Vernon
 1934 – William Hume-Rothery, E. A. Rudge
 1933 – Constance Tipper, Arthur Joseph Victor Underwood
 1932 – Walter James Rees, W. R. Schoeller
 1930 – , Ulick Richardson Evans

See also

 List of chemistry awards
 List of engineering awards

References 

Awards of the Royal Society of Chemistry
Awards established in 1930
British awards
Chemical engineering awards